The enzyme Inositol-polyphosphate 5-phosphatase (EC 3.1.3.56, systematic name 1D-myo-inositol-1,4,5-trisphosphate 5-phosphohydrolase; other names type I inositol-polyphosphate phosphatase, inositol trisphosphate phosphomonoesterase, InsP3/Ins(1,3,4,5)P4 5-phosphatase, inosine triphosphatase, D-myo-inositol 1,4,5-triphosphate 5-phosphatase, D-myo-inositol 1,4,5-trisphosphate 5-phosphatase, L-myo-inositol 1,4,5-trisphosphate-monoesterase, inositol phosphate 5-phosphomonoesterase, inositol-1,4,5-trisphosphate/1,3,4,5-tetrakisphosphate 5-phosphatase, Ins(1,4,5)P3 5-phosphataseD-myo-inositol(1,4,5)/(1,3,4,5)-polyphosphate 5-phosphatase, inositol 1,4,5-trisphosphate phosphatase, inositol polyphosphate-5-phosphatase, myo-inositol-1,4,5-trisphosphate 5-phosphatase, inositol-1,4,5-trisphosphate 5-phosphatase) catalyses the following reaction 

 (1) D-myo-inositol 1,4,5-trisphosphate + H2O  myo-inositol 1,4-bisphosphate + phosphate
 (2) 1D-myo-inositol 1,3,4,5-tetrakisphosphate + H2O  1D-myo-inositol 1,3,4-trisphosphate + phosphate

One mammalian isoform is known.

References

External links 
 

EC 3.1.3